Sreshka  (also written Srechka, Sireshka, Sireshkan or Srejka) is a village located in the Tel Kaif District of the Ninawa Governorate in Iraq. The village is located ca.  south of Alqosh and ca.  north of Telskuf in the Nineveh Plains. It belongs to the disputed territories of Northern Iraq.

Sreshka is populated by Yazidis.

References

Populated places in Nineveh Governorate
Nineveh Plains
Yazidi populated places in Iraq